Unin  (formerly  or Alt-Tonnin) is a village in the administrative district of Gmina Wolin, within Kamień County, West Pomeranian Voivodeship, in north-western Poland. 

The village has a population of 400.

Notable residents
 Ernst von Hoeppner (1860–1922), German general

References

Unin